Hog Hollow is a valley in Oregon County in the U.S. state of Missouri.

Hog Hollow was so named on account of the abundance of hogs in the valley.

In popular culture
In The Dresden Files, Ebenezar McCoy, a farmer and wizard from Hog Hollow, takes on Harry Dresden as an apprentice after Dresden's trial by the White Council.

References

Valleys of Oregon County, Missouri
Valleys of Missouri